Bouneima  was an ancient Greek city in the region of Macedonia (region), Tymphaea, said to have been founded by Odysseus

See also
List of cities in ancient Macedonia

References 

Cities in ancient Macedonia
Former populated places in Greece
Populated places in ancient Macedonia
Locations in Greek mythology
Lost ancient cities and towns